Herman Henstenburgh (1667, in Hoorn – 1726, in Hoorn), was an 18th-century painter from the Northern Netherlands.

Biography
According to Johan van Gool he was very good at copying prints and copied the watercolours of Pieter Holstein, which were so good that his parents let him become a pupil of Johannes Bronkhorst in 1683. Bronckhorst was able to live by his paintings, but supplemented his income with his work on the side as pastrybaker until his death, and Henstenburgh clearly learned this business from him as well, because he took over this business when Bronckhorst died. His portrait was drawn in the album of Joanna Koerten by Nicolaas Verkolje with a poem by Feitema.

According to the RKD he was a registered pupil of Johannes Bronckhorst and is known for fruit and flower still lifes, with a specialty in insects and birds.

References

Herman Henstenburgh on Artnet

1667 births
1726 deaths
18th-century Dutch painters
18th-century Dutch male artists
Dutch male painters
People from Hoorn